The following lists events that happened during 1998 in Republic of Albania.

Incumbents 
 President: Rexhep Meidani
 Prime Minister: Fatos Nano (until 2 October), Pandeli Majko (starting from 2 October)

Events 
 Escalating unrest in Kosovo sends refugees across border into Albania.
Violent anti-government street protests after prominent opposition Democratic Party politician, Azem Hajdari, shot dead by unidentified gunmen.
Fatos Nano quits. Former student activist, Pandeli Majko, named as new prime minister.

Deaths
April - Kristaq Rama - Albanian sculptor, teacher and politician.
12 September - Azem Hajdari, Albanian politician (b. 1963)

References 

 
1990s in Albania
Years of the 20th century in Albania